Spahan, also known as Parthau was a Sasanian province in Late Antiquity, that lay within central Iran, almost corresponding to the present-day Isfahan Province in Iran.

Etymology
Spahān is attested in various Middle Persian seals and inscriptions, including that of Zoroastrian priest Kartir. The present-day name (Isfahan) is the Arabicized form of Ispahan (unlike Middle Persian, New Persian does not allow initial consonant clusters such as sp). The region appears with the abbreviation GD (Gay, Southern Media) on Sasanian numismatics. In Ptolemy's Geographia it appears as Aspadana, translating to "place of gathering for the army". It is believed that Spahān derives from spādānām 'the armies', Old Persian plural of spāda (from which derives spāh 'army' in Middle Persian). The province is called Parthau on Shapur I's inscription at the Ka'ba-ye Zartosht.

History
Spahan became a part of the Sasanian Empire in 224, after Ardashir I (r. r. 224–242) seized its capital and killed its ruler, Shadh-Shapur. During the reign of Ardashir's son and successor Shapur I (r. 240-270), a certain Varzin was appointed as the governor of the province.

In 642, the battle of Spahan took place, where it was fought between the Rashidun Arabs and the Sasanians. The Arabs were victorious during the battle, where they reportedly killed the prominent Mihran commander Shahrvaraz Jadhuyih. After the battle, the Arabs made peace with Fadhusfan, the governor of the city. According to an Arab historian, many civilians were killed or enslaved after the battle.

References

Sources
 

 
 

Provinces of the Sasanian Empire
224 establishments
States and territories established in the 220s